Aerolux Light Corporation was a manufacturer of artful gas-discharge light bulbs from the 1930s through the 1970s. Aerolux made these bulbs in a factory in New York City. US Patents dating back to the 1930s describe the design and construction of these bulbs.

 Philip J. Kayatt (1896–1975) was president of the company.

Description 
Aerolux gas discharge light bulbs contained low pressure gas, either neon or argon, or a mixture of the two. Also within the bulb were metal sculptures coated with phosphors. These phosphors fluoresced when excited by glow discharge. Because glow discharge occurs readily at 110-120 volts AC, one could use these bulbs in standard household lamps in the United States.

The phosphors used in the bulbs were somewhat brittle, necessitating care in handling. Shaking or jarring the bulbs would cause flaking and migration of the phosphors to other parts of the metallic sculpture. Such handling would leave non-fluorescing portions of the sculpture and/or migration of phosphors to other surfaces within the bulb.

Aerolux bulbs consumed about 3-5 watts of power. The bulbs had high yield of light produced versus electricity consumed, generally in the range of 50-60 lumens/watt, compared to 12-18 lumens/watt for a tungsten filament incandescent bulb.

See also 
 Neon lamp
 List of light sources
 Neon sign

References

External links 

 Aerolux bulb in the Museum of Modern Art in New York City
 Kilokat's antique light bulb site

Neon lighting